Sara Labrousse (born 15 April 1988) is a French competitor in synchronized swimming. In the 2012 Summer Olympics, held in London, United Kingdom, she came tenth in the Women's Duet competition (alongside Chloé Willhelm).

References

French synchronized swimmers
Synchronized swimmers at the 2012 Summer Olympics
Olympic synchronized swimmers of France
Sportspeople from Lyon
Living people
1988 births